Bedford Avenue may refer to:

 Bedford Avenue (Brooklyn), the longest street in Brooklyn, New York City

New York City Subway stations
Bedford Avenue (BMT Canarsie Line) at North Seventh Street; serving the  train
Bedford–Nostrand Avenues (IND Crosstown Line) at Lafayette Avenue; serving the  train